Jim Newman is an American actor, writer, producer, and director. Born in Stevens Point, Wisconsin, he lives in Manhattan, New York.

He has written animation scripts for Casper, Toonsylvania, and Mega Babies.

Jim was also the director and producer of the live stage version of What's My Line? in Hollywood.

Notes

Living people
Year of birth missing (living people)